Alessandro Rasini (25 November 1918 – 3 September 2006) was an Italian bobsledder who competed in the early 1950s. He finished ninth in the four-man event at the 1952 Winter Olympics in Oslo. He was born in Milan in 1918 and died in Trieste in 2006.

References

1952 bobsleigh four-man results
Sandro Rasini's profile at Sports Reference.com

External links
 

Italian male bobsledders
Olympic bobsledders of Italy
Bobsledders at the 1952 Winter Olympics
1918 births
2006 deaths